Koče is a village south of Postojna in the Inner Carniola region of Slovenia.

The local church in the settlement is dedicated to Saint Margaret and belongs to the Parish of Slavina.

References

External links
Koče on Geopedia

Populated places in the Municipality of Postojna